Stationary Subspace Analysis (SSA) in statistics is a blind source separation algorithm which factorizes a multivariate time series into stationary and non-stationary components.

Introduction 

In many settings, the measured time series contains contributions from various underlying sources that cannot be measured directly. For instance, in EEG analysis, the electrodes on the scalp record the activity of a large number of sources located inside the brain. These sources can be stationary or non-stationary, but they are not discernible in the electrode signals, which are a mixture of these sources. SSA allows the separation of the stationary from the non-stationary sources in an observed time series.

According to the SSA model, the observed multivariate time series  is assumed to be generated as a linear superposition of stationary sources  and non-stationary sources , 

Given samples from the time series , the aim of Stationary Subspace Analysis is to estimate the inverse mixing matrix  separating the stationary from non-stationary sources in the mixture .

Identifiability of the solution 

The true stationary sources  are identifiable (up to a linear transformation) and the true non-stationary subspace  is identifiable. The true non-stationary sources  and the true stationary subspace  cannot be identified, because arbitrary contributions from the stationary sources do not change the non-stationary nature of a non-stationary source.

Applications and extensions 

Stationary subspace analysis has been successfully applied to Brain-computer interfacing, computer vision and temporal segmentation. There are variants of the SSA problem that can be solved analytically in closed form, without numerical optimization.

See also 

 Blind signal separation (BSS)
 Factor analysis
 Independent component analysis
 Cointegration

References 

Multivariate time series